Regina Jacobs (born August 28, 1963 in Los Angeles) is an American former middle-distance runner from Los Angeles. She had an extended career that included two IAAF World Championships in Athletics silver medals and an indoor world championship at the age of 39.  Three months later, her career ended after winning what would have been a fifth straight National Championship in the 1500 meters when she was disqualified and banned for doping related to the BALCO scandal.

Track & field career
After graduating from Stanford University, Jacobs represented the US in three consecutive Summer Olympics, starting in 1988 in Seoul, South Korea.

Jacobs took second place in the 1500 m race at the 6th World Championships in Athletics in Athens (4:04.63) in 1997, and again won the silver medal in the 1500 m at the World Championships in Sevilla in 1999 (4:00.35). In her years of running she won 25 national titles. On February 1, 2003, at age 39 Jacobs set a world record in the indoor 1500 m with a time of 3:59.98, becoming the first woman to break 4 minutes in the event. Jacobs remains the only American woman to run under 4 minutes in the indoor 1500 meters and stands as the USATF American Indoor record holder in 2015.

In her final years of competition, she was coached by her husband, Tom Craig.

In 2003, she retired after she tested positive for BALCO's 'designer' steroid THG and was suspended from competing in track & field for four years by the United States Anti-Doping Agency.

Real Estate Career

Following her ban and subsequent retirement, Jacobs became a real estate agent in the Oakland, California, area. She earned an MBA from the University of California, Berkeley. She currently works for The Grubb Co. Realtors, with her husband on her team.

References

External links 

Jacobs handed ban from BBC
Regina Jacobs Sets 1500M World Record from Cool Running
Steroid Is Reportedly Found In Top Runner's Urine Test from The New York Times

1963 births
Living people
Track and field athletes from Los Angeles
American female middle-distance runners
African-American female track and field athletes
Olympic track and field athletes of the United States
Athletes (track and field) at the 1988 Summer Olympics
Athletes (track and field) at the 1992 Summer Olympics
Athletes (track and field) at the 1996 Summer Olympics
World Athletics Championships athletes for the United States
World Athletics Championships medalists
American sportspeople in doping cases
Doping cases in athletics
Goodwill Games medalists in athletics
World Athletics Indoor Championships winners
Competitors at the 1998 Goodwill Games
21st-century African-American people
21st-century African-American women
20th-century African-American sportspeople
20th-century African-American women